KMYT-TV (channel 41) is a television station in Tulsa, Oklahoma, United States, affiliated with MyNetworkTV. It is owned by Imagicomm Communications alongside Fox affiliate KOKI-TV (channel 23). The two stations share studios on East 27th Street and South Memorial Drive (near W. G. Skelly Park) in the Audubon neighborhood of southeast Tulsa; KMYT-TV's transmitter is located on South 273rd East Avenue (between 91st Street South and 101st Street South, next to the Muskogee Turnpike) in the western city limits of Coweta.

History

Early history
The station first signed on the air on March 18, 1981 as KGCT-TV (standing for "Green Country Television"). It was founded as a joint venture between Green Country Television Associates, Ltd. (headed by former CBS executive Ray Beindorf, who served as KGCT's first general manager, and Leonard Anderson—who would subsequently sell his interest in the group, including stakes which he acquired from Beindorf months after the station's sign-on—to Armstrong Investments CEO Robert A. Armstrong in 1981) and satellite resale carrier Satellite Television Systems (STS; renamed Satellite Syndicated Systems [SSS] shortly before sign-on), which beat out the Western Area Bureau of Information and a standalone bid by STS for the license. The UHF channel 41 allocation had been dormant since an application by the Beacon Television Corporation to launch a station over that allocation (which was to be assigned KWID as its call letters) was reversed following the application's approval by the Federal Communications Commission (FCC) in 1968, and its approved construction permit was turned in by Beacon to the FCC in May 1969.

Originally operating as an independent station, it was the second such station to sign on in the Tulsa market, after KOKI-TV (channel 23, now a Fox affiliate), which signed on six months earlier on October 26, 1980; not counting short-lived UHF outlets, it was also the seventh television station and the fifth commercial station to sign on in the Tulsa market. It originally operated from studio facilities located in a former Lerner Shops store at the Main Mall pedestrian park and shopping complex on South Harvard Avenue (near downtown Tulsa's Bartlett Square district). (The complex, which then spanned seven blocks west to east from Main Street to Boston Avenue and north to south from 3rd to 6th Streets, was demolished to make way for an expansion of Main Street to throughway traffic in 2003.) KGCT initially maintained a mixed news/information and entertainment schedule, running low-cost syndicated and barter programs (consisting of cartoons, sitcoms and drama series and westerns) and classic movies from sign-on at 6:00 a.m. until 12:00 p.m., and a mix of news and talk programming during the afternoon and early access time periods. The remainder of the broadcast day was occupied by the SSS-owned In-Home Theatre (IT), a subscription service – transmitted over the channel 41 signal each weekday from 7:00 p.m. until sign-off at 2:00 a.m. and weekends from 1:00 p.m. to 2:00 a.m. – that carried uncut theatrically released feature films, entertainment specials (including concerts and Vegas revues), sporting events (including college football and basketball games involving the Tulsa Golden Hurricane, and football and basketball games and wrestling matches involving the Oklahoma State Cowboys, and NBA games featuring the Dallas Mavericks, some of which commenced play before 7:00 p.m., resulting in fans often missing the start of many contests) and, for an additional monthly fee, softcore versions of pornographic films. Prospective subscribers were required to rent a special set-top decoder box to unencrypt the channel 41 signal during hours when the station carried IT programming in order to receive the service. (SSS had also applied to operate translators in Norman, Lawton, Seminole, Stillwater, Edmond and Chickasha to relay IT's programming across portions of central and southwestern Oklahoma, including areas where it would have competed with VEU, a similar over-the-air pay service that transmitted weeknights and weekends over Oklahoma City independent KAUT between October 1980 and September 1982.)

After the station shuttered its news department in June 1981, KGCT revamped its program schedule to incorporate simulcasts of CNN's daytime news programs, agricultural programming, and business news from the Financial News Network (FNN) during the daytime, along with some religious programs, cartoons and a selection of first-run and off-network barter syndicated shows to fill the remainder of the station's unencrypted airtime. (Of note, channel 41 served as the original Tulsa broadcaster of Entertainment Tonight—then a barter syndicated program that had yet to ascend to the status it has today as one of syndication's highest-profile programs—which aired on KGCT for the program's first season, from September 1982 to September 1983.) Overall, however, the station had suffered from relatively low viewership, putting KGCT at a competitive disadvantage to dominant independent KOKI; it also frequently suffered from technical problems, usually transmitting a substandard picture and experiencing periodic problems with the audio and video signals. Around that time, KGCT relocated its operations to a new studio facility on South Garnett Road and East 58th Street in southeast Tulsa.

In September 1982, KGCT entered into a time-brokerage agreement with local minister Jack Rehburg, who rebranded it after his operating company, Tulsa Christian Television. (The meaning behind the station's call letters concurrently became "Knit God's Children Together".) Channel 41's format during this period had largely relied on live and taped Christian-oriented religious programs during the morning and for most of the afternoon Monday through Saturdays and throughout the daytime hours on Sundays, along with a few low-budget secular shows during the late afternoon and nightly In-Home Theater programming (creating the incongruity of the same station airing religious shows during its free airtime, and R-rated and some softcore pornographic films at night while the signal was scrambled). Rehburg – who would purchase the construction permit for KDLF-TV (channel 47, now KWHB) that June, before selling the religious independent to Coit Drapery and Cleaners shortly after its June 1985 sign-on as KTCT – terminated the lease in a dispute with KGCT ownership in the spring of 1984. Southern Satellite Systems shut down In-Home Theatre on October 31, 1984, citing a significant downturn in subscribers and revenue associated with the emergence of multichannel television franchises offering cable-originated premium services—such as Home Box Office (HBO) and Showtime—in Tulsa and Detroit (where the service was carried by Ann Arbor-licensed WIHT, now Ion Television affiliate WPXD-TV); at the time that SSS was launching the In-Home Theater service over KGCT, cable service was widely available within northeastern Oklahoma through providers such as Tulsa Cable Television (which commenced operations in April 1980) within Tulsa proper, and in surrounding areas through Green Country Cable (which serviced Jenks, Glenpool, Sapulpa and Wagoner), Bartlesville Cablevision, Claremore Cable TV Co., Owasso Cablevision, Skiatook Cablevision and Cablevision of Muskogee among other systems, making the need to subscribe to an over-the-air pay service no longer necessary. The removal of religious and In-Home Theatre programming resulted in the Armstrong-SSS partnership having to acquire new equipment, programming and transmitter facilities on short notice. KGCT switched to a format consisting of home shopping and low-budget entertainment programming, along with network programs that NBC affiliate KJRH (channel 2), CBS affiliate KOTV (channel 6) and ABC affiliate KTUL (channel 8) had declined to carry on their respective schedules.

By 1985, the station had shifted to a schedule made up entirely of barter content, featuring a mix of cartoons, religious programs and low-rated first-run syndicated shows. Concurrently, the Green Country-SSS venture sold the station to Channel 41 Associates for $5.05 million; although the non-compete covenant deal received FCC approval, the acquisition would not be consummated. Later that year, Green Country Associates acquired Satellite Syndicated Systems's interest in KGCT, only to turn it over to Tempo Enterprises—then the uplinker of the national superstation feed of Atlanta independent station WTBS (now standalone cable channel TBS nationwide and WPCH-TV in the Atlanta market)—after Armstrong ran into difficulties maintaining the venture capital to run the station because of corporate financial issues tied to the 1980s oil business downturn. Although it was the lower-rated of the market's two independents, KGCT was approached by the Fox Broadcasting Company to become the network's Tulsa charter affiliate in the spring of 1986. After initially reaching a contract deal, Fox management nullified the agreement and quickly reached a new one with KOKI, as channel 41 lacked sufficient cable carriage within the market (a partial result of a 1986 decision by Tulsa Cable Television – whose owner, United Artists Cable, transferred the local cable franchise rights to Tele-Communications, Inc., after the company's 1991 acquisition of United Artists Theaters – to pull the station from its lineup).

On December 26, 1987, a  transmission tower owned by KTUL, which was also leased to KGCT and several local radio stations to house their transmitters, collapsed due to heavy freezing rain accumulations from a major ice storm that hit northeastern Oklahoma over the Christmas weekend. Both KTUL and KGCT restored over-the-air service later that week from a leased tower, where their transmitters resided until a new  tower was constructed near the existing Coweta tower site in the summer of 1988.

In April 1988, Tele-Communications Inc. (through subsidiary Tempo Acquisition Co.) purchased a 51% interest in Tempo Enterprises, in a deal in which Tempo also agreed to develop a direct-broadcast satellite service that would expand pay television service to areas without cable access. TCI subsequently sought buyers for KGCT, WIHT and Conyers, Georgia radio station WTPO (now WPBS), which were contingent on receiving approval of the Tempo purchase. That December, TCI sold its 50% stake in KGCT to Green Country Associates; Beindorf subsequently sold his interest in the company to Armstrong. Armstrong Investments fielded offers from three unnamed companies—one of which was owned by KGCT's then-general manager Bob Davis—to buy the station; the company planned to discontinue programming on KGCT, unless a cash offer was accepted by February 1, 1989. With no deal being reached before the deadline and plans for a time-brokerage agreement to keep the station operational until a sale was completed falling through, channel 41 went dark as planned at 2:00 a.m. on February 1, for what was intended to be a 30-day "re-evaluation" window to weigh the offers to buy the KGCT license and assets. (The FCC gave Green Country Associates until April 30 to complete the sale negotiations.) All 17 station employees were given a leave of absence benefits package.

Stability, then transition
On July 19, 1989, Green Country Associates sold KGCT to Tulsa TV 41 Corp. (headed by Dennis Lisack, director of Louisville, Kentucky-based Christian ministry organization The Messiah Project) for $500,000. Although the sale received FCC approval on August 23, the agreement was terminated shortly before the station's mandatory return date of August 30 after the group was unable to obtain sufficient financing to buy the assets. A suitable buyer for KGCT was found in June 1990, when RDS Broadcasting (named after its managing partners, Bob Rosenheim and Associates, Douglas Communications CEO Douglas Bornstein and infomercial production company Synchronal Corporation, headed by group co-partner Richard Kaylor) agreed to purchase the station for $157,500; the sale, which marked RDS's first station acquisition, received FCC approval on August 27, 1990 and was finalized early that September. Channel 41 returned to the air as KTFO (for "Tulsa Forty-One") on May 22, 1991, with a schedule—airing initially from 6:00 a.m. to 2:00 a.m.—consisting mainly of religious programs and infomercials, as well as some comedies, sports, classic films, and network series declined by KJRH and KOTV. The station – which, during its dark period, had lost the local rights to some syndicated programs and sports packages, some of which were picked up by KOKI – gradually added entertainment-based barter programs, movies and sporting events to the schedule during the spring and summer of 1991.

After having been unavailable on cable within Tulsa proper for the past seven years and virtually market-wide through its nine combined years of operation, in February 1992, KTFO management reached a deal with Tulsa Public Schools (TPS) to lease programming time on a tertiary educational access channel that was set to launch the following month on United Artists Cable (via a 1988 agreement with Tulsa Cable that required it to allocate an existing channel for a TPS secondary service if the provider's headend infrastructure was not rebuilt within four years to allow expansion of its channel lineup), and donate $40,000 for area schools to upgrade their television equipment. The leasing agreement was revoked by the district board on March 17, after provider parent TCI – which was not informed of the agreement until five days before it was set to take effect on that date – disagreed with the contractual terms. The contract was subsequently renegotiated, granting KTFO approval to lease airtime on the Tulsa Public Schools II service. Beginning on March 30, KTFO transmitted on TCI channel 41 (or channel 42 for subscribers with addressable set-top boxes) from 5:00 p.m. to 8:00 a.m. weekdays and all day on weekends, when the school district was not carrying Tulsa Junior College telecourses over the channel space; the station's programming filled airtime on TCI channel 41 formerly occupied by a TPS bulletin board and programming from NASA Select (now NASA TV) that were shown on the TPS II service. (TCI would move KTFO/TPS II to channel 10 in January 1993, and subsequently ceded the channel space to KTFO full-time that July, while giving TPS II a full-time feed on channel 20.)

By the fall of 1993, the station ran a wide variety of programs on its schedule – consisting of some children's programs during the morning hours, some first-run syndicated shows (including comedies) in the early evenings, off-network sitcoms and drama series, and older movies on weekends, as well as a limited amount of local programming (such as public affairs talk show Oklahoma Forum, and viewer call-in shows Out of Left Field and Open Line, all of which were hosted by former KJRH sports director Sam Jones). On November 3, 1993, San Antonio-based Clear Channel Television – which had purchased KOKI-TV three years earlier – entered into a local marketing agreement with RDS Broadcasting, under which Clear Channel/KOKI would provide programming, advertising and other administrative services for KTFO. Channel 41 subsequently migrated its operations from the Garnett Avenue facility into KOKI's offices at the low-rise Fox Plaza building on East 54th Street and South Yale Avenue (near LaFortune Park) in southeast Tulsa; Clear Channel submitted job offers to eleven of KTFO's 14 employees to oversee both stations. Both KOKI and KTFO pooled programming inventories, with channel 41 acquiring additional talk and reality shows as well as more recent and higher-profile classic sitcoms and drama series (such as Perfect Strangers, Perry Mason, M*A*S*H, ALF and Star Trek) as well as more recent film titles to complement channel 23's offerings. Many higher-rated syndicated shows (including sitcoms and cartoons) continued to air on or were sold directly to KOKI, but some programs were shared by both stations, with some of the stronger programs in KOKI's inventory being added to channel 41's schedule.

UPN affiliation
On January 25, 1994, Clear Channel reached an agreement with Paramount Television and Chris-Craft/United Television to affiliate four independent stations owned and/or operated by the group with the United Paramount Network (UPN), which was founded by Chris-Craft and its BHC Communications/United Television broadcasting subsidiary, in a programming partnership with Viacom (which was in the process of acquiring Paramount Pictures and its related assets from Gulf+Western around the time of the agreement, and would directly purchase a 50% interest in UPN in 1996). In a joint press release, Chris-Craft and Paramount confirmed that KTFO would serve as UPN's charter affiliate for the Tulsa market. However, it was likely to have joined UPN in any event as the fledgling network's only other option among the area's commercial television stations was LeSEA Broadcasting-owned independent KWHB (channel 47), which would likely have declined to carry any network programs that did not meet the Christian-based religious organization's strict secular program content guidelines. (Despite that issue, KWHB would become a part-time affiliate of The WB when that network launched on January 11, 1995.) Channel 41 formally affiliated with the network when it launched on January 16, 1995.

Alongside UPN prime time programming, KTFO – which concurrently changed its branding to "UPN 41" – carried some recent and classic off-network sitcoms and drama series, movies in prime time and on weekends, some first-run syndicated shows, and a blend of cartoons and a few live-action children's shows from both individual distributors and The Disney Afternoon syndication block. (The station's children's programming inventory expanded when UPN launched the UPN Kids program block in September 1995, and was eventually relegated to syndicated content after the successor Disney's One Too block was discontinued by the network in August 2003.) As it had done for most of its tenure as an independent, KTFO continued to fill the 7:00 to 9:00 p.m. time slot with feature films and some first-run syndicated programs as, at the time of its launch, UPN had only maintained a lineup of prime time programs on Monday and Tuesday nights. This would become less of an issue as UPN launched a supplemental weekend film package in September 1995—the UPN Movie Trailer, which was eventually discontinued in September 2000, leaving a one-hour-long, same-week evening repeat block of UPN drama and reality series as its only non-children-focused weekend offering for the remainder of the network's existence—and additional nights of programming over the next four years, adopting a five-night weekly schedule on Monday through Fridays in September 1998. As time went on, KTFO began to divest many of the classic sitcom reruns that populated its schedule, in favor of airing more talk, reality and court shows on its daytime schedule and more recent sitcoms and first-run and off-network drama series in the evening. From 1998 to 2006, some station promotions also included the "UPN Girls," a group of four women between the ages of 18 and 25, who also served as hosts for a Saturday night movie showcase on KTFO and made publicity appearances at local events. (Other UPN affiliates that Clear Channel owned or managed, such as KASN [now a CW affiliate] in Little Rock and WTEV-TV [now CBS affiliate WJAX-TV] in Jacksonville employed the "UPN Girls" concept during this period.)

On December 15, 1999, four months after the FCC began permitting any commercial broadcasting firm the ability to legally own two commercial television stations within the same media market, Clear Channel announced it would acquire the KTFO license outright as part of a four-station deal with the San Antonio-based Mercury Broadcasting Company worth $11.663 million. The sale was approved by the FCC on March 9, 2000; following consummation of the transaction that May, KOKI and KTFO became the first legal broadcast television duopoly in the Tulsa market. In January 2002, Clear Channel relocated the operations of KOKI and KTFO from Fox Plaza into a  studio complex located at 2625 South Memorial Drive. The building—which was originally constructed in 1962 for an expansion of the Oertle's Family Discount Store and later rented out to house a Burlington Coat Factory location—was purchased to allow the operations of the two television stations and Clear Channel's five Tulsa radio properties (which had previously operated from the Mid-Oklahoma Building on 41st Street and Skelly Drive in southwest Tulsa) to be housed under a single facility as well as to allow KOKI/KTFO to commence digital television transmissions and news operations. (An additional  of building space was reserved for the Clear Channel Event Center exhibition complex.)

As a MyNetworkTV affiliate
On January 24, 2006, UPN parent company CBS Corporation and Time Warner, parent company of The WB through its Warner Bros. Entertainment division, announced that they would dissolve the two networks to create The CW, a joint venture between the two media companies that initially featured programs from its two predecessor networks as well as original first-run series produced for the new network. Subsequently, on February 22, 2006, News Corporation announced the launch of MyNetworkTV, a network operated by then-sibling subsidiaries Fox Television Stations and Twentieth Television (the former is now part of Fox Corporation, and the latter now operates as a unit of The Walt Disney Company by way of Disney's 2019 acquisition of 20th Century Fox) that was created to primarily to provide network programming to UPN and WB stations with which The CW decided against affiliating based on their local viewership standing in comparison to the outlet that the network ultimately chose, allowing these stations another option besides converting to independent stations.

On April 10, 2006, in an affiliate press release published by network management, Muskogee-based KWBT (channel 19) – which subsequently changed its callsign to KQCW in reference to its new affiliation – was confirmed as The CW's Tulsa charter affiliate. Since the network chose its charter stations based on which of them among The WB and UPN's respective affiliate bodies was the highest-rated in each market, KWBT (which had finalized its acquisition by KOTV parent Griffin Communications almost three months earlier) was chosen to join The CW over KTFO as, at the time of its agreement, channel 19 had been the higher-rated of the two stations despite channel 41 having had a fourteen-year operational headstart on KWBT. Two months later on June 15, Clear Channel Television and News Corporation's Fox Entertainment Group unit announced an agreement in which KTFO would become the market's MyNetworkTV affiliate. Subsequently, on August 21, in an effort to use its new affiliation as a branding avenue, the station changed its call letters to KMYT-TV (for "MyNetworkTV Tulsa" or "MyNetworkTV"). Channel 41 officially joined MyNetworkTV upon that network's launch on September 5, 2006, two weeks before UPN formally ceased operations; the station concurrently changed its branding to "My41 Tulsa," adopting a logo based around MyNetworkTV's multi-pattern "blue TV" design. KWBT remained a WB affiliate until that network ceased operations on September 17, and officially affiliated with The CW when it debuted the following day (September 18).

On April 20, 2007, following the completion of the company's $18.7-billion purchase by private equity firms Thomas H. Lee Partners and Bain Capital, Clear Channel entered into an agreement to sell its television stations to Providence Equity Partners for $1.2 billion. The sale was approved by the FCC on December 1, 2007; after settling a lawsuit by Clear Channel ownership to force the equity firm to complete the sale, the Providence acquisition was finalized on March 14, 2008, at which time it formed Newport Television as a holding company to own and manage 27 of Clear Channel's 35 television stations (including KOKI and KMYT), and began transferring the remaining nine stations (all in markets where conflicts with FCC ownership rules precluded a legal duopoly from continuing under Newport) to High Plains Broadcasting, a licensee corporation formed to allow those stations to remain operationally tied to their associated Newport-owned outlets through local marketing agreements.

As part of a series of piecemeal sales announced on July 19, 2012 that also involved the larger Nexstar Broadcasting Group and Sinclair Broadcast Group, Newport Television announced that it would sell KOKI-TV and KMYT as well as Fox affiliate WAWS (now WFOX-TV) and the intellectual assets of WTEV-TV in Jacksonville to the Cox Media Group subsidiary of Atlanta-based Cox Enterprises for $253.011 million. The purchase placed the KOKI-KMYT duopoly under common ownership with Cox Radio's Tulsa cluster of KRMG (740 AM and 102.3 FM), KRAV-FM (96.5), KWEN (95.5 FM) and KJSR (103.3 FM), and, in the first instance since the 2003 repeal of an FCC cross-ownership ban in which the owner of a local cable provider acquired a television station in the same market, also made the two stations sister properties to Cox Communications, which has been the dominant cable operator in northeastern Oklahoma since it acquired TCI's Tulsa-area franchise in April 2000. The FCC approved the transaction on October 23, 2012; the sale was finalized on December 3. Although the sale separated KOKI/KMYT from its former radio sisters under Clear Channel ownership, iHeartMedia's Tulsa cluster continued to operate out of the Memorial Drive facility until the summer of 2017, when Cox moved its Tulsa-area radio stations into the building and iHeart moved its local stations into a new facility on Yale Avenue and 71st Street (northeast of Oral Roberts University) in southeast Tulsa's Richmond Hills section.

On February 15, 2019, private equity firm Apollo Global Management announced that it would acquire the respective television properties of Cox Media Group and Northwest Broadcasting and Cox's other print and broadcast properties in Atlanta and Dayton, Ohio (including the Atlanta Journal-Constitution, the Dayton Daily News, and the company's respective radio clusters in those two markets) in a deal valued at $3.1 billion that would result in Cox Enterprises maintaining a minority interest in the acquired properties. Although the group originally planned to operate under the name Terrier Media, it was later announced on June 26 that Apollo would retain the Cox Media Group name post-acquisition, along with acquiring Cox's advertising business and the remainder of its Cox Radio unit (including its five Tulsa-area radio stations). The sale was completed on December 17, 2019.

Sale to Imagicomm
On March 29, 2022, Cox Media Group announced it would sell KMYT-TV, KOKI-TV and 16 other stations to Imagicomm Communications, an affiliate of the parent company of the INSP cable channel, for $488 million; the sale was completed on August 1.

Subchannel history

KMYT-DT2
KMYT-DT2 is the Cozi TV-affiliated second digital subchannel of KMYT-TV, broadcasting in standard definition on channel 41.2.

KMYT-TV launched a digital subchannel on virtual channel 41.2 in November 2006, to serve as a charter affiliate of the Clear Channel-owned classic television service Variety Television Network (VTV); KMYT-DT2 ceased operations in April 2009, following Newport Television's decision to shutter VTV's operations. The subchannel was relaunched on May 1, 2011 to serve as an affiliate of music video network The Country Network (later renamed ZUUS Country in February 2013), through an agreement with Newport Television encompassing five of the company's CBS, CW and MyNetworkTV affiliates. (The subchannel subsequently began to be carried on Cox Communications digital channel 129.) On April 1, 2014, KMYT-DT2 switched to movie-oriented network getTV as part of an affiliation agreement between network parent Sony Pictures Television Networks and the Cox Media Group that also involved three of its sister stations (WTEV-TV, KIRO-TV/Seattle and WAXN-TV/Charlotte).

In September 2020, subchannel 41.2 flipped to Cozi TV, a classic television network owned by NBCUniversal.

KMYT-DT3
KMYT-DT3 is the Start TV-affiliated third digital subchannel of KMYT-TV, broadcasting in standard definition on channel 41.3.

KMYT launched a digital subchannel on virtual channel 41.3 on April 1, 2014, initially serving as a temporary affiliate of ZUUS Country, which was displaced from KMYT-DT2 to accommodate its switch to getTV. About 2½ months later, on July 17, Katz Broadcasting (which would be purchased by the E. W. Scripps Company, owner of NBC affiliate KJRH-TV, in August 2017) announced it had signed an agreement with Cox Media Group to carry Grit on the group's television stations in Tulsa and Orlando and sister network Escape (now Ion Mystery) on its Tulsa and Charlotte properties. KMYT-DT3 switched its affiliation to Grit at 12:00 a.m. on October 1, 2014 (the switch was originally slated to take place on August 18, but was delayed by KOKI-KMYT management as the ZUUS Country affiliation contract was not set to expire for 1½ months). On February 28, 2021, E. W. Scripps Company and Ion Media announced that Ion Shop is being replaced by Grit on KTPX-TV, Ion Television affiliate on subchannel 44.4.

In July 2021, Start TV moved from 41.5 to 41.3.

KMYT-DT4
KMYT-DT4 is the Heroes & Icons-affiliated fourth digital subchannel of KMYT-TV, broadcasting in standard definition on channel 41.4. Through an affiliation agreement between Weigel Broadcasting and Cox Media Group, KMYT launched a digital subchannel on virtual channel 41.4 on August 27, 2015, to serve as an affiliate of classic television network Heroes & Icons.

KMYT-DT5
KMYT-DT5 is the This TV-affiliated fifth digital subchannel of KMYT-TV, broadcasting in standard definition on channel 41.5. Through an affiliation agreement between Weigel Broadcasting and Cox Media Group, KMYT launched a digital subchannel on virtual channel 41.5 in October 2020 to serve as an affiliate of Start TV.

In September 2021, the subchannel became a This TV affiliate.

Programming
In addition to its primary affiliation with the MyNetworkTV programming service, KMYT may take on the responsibility of airing Fox network programs that KOKI-TV must preempt to provide extended breaking news or severe weather coverage. Since the programming service consists of off-network reruns, channel 41 may also broadcast MyNetworkTV programs on tape delay to air in the late prime time or late fringe slots – in order to fulfill contractual advertising makegoods – in such situations. Syndicated programs broadcast on KMYT-TV  include The Steve Wilkos Show, Last Man Standing, Maury, Family Feud, Judge Jerry, Hot Bench, The Simpsons, Tamron Hall, Judge Judy, Dish Nation, The Wendy Williams Show, The Real, TMZ on TV (and companion program TMZ Live), Divorce Court, The People's Court, Family Guy, Bob's Burgers and Inside Edition.

Sports programming
Channel 41 has carried various sporting events for most of its first three decades on the air; in its early days as an independent, many of these broadcasts helped boost viewership for the then-KGCT, which had typically lagged distantly behind KOKI-TV in the ratings among the market's UHF commercial outlets under the ownership of the Green Country Associates-SSS/Tempo venture. From 1982 to 1984, the station carried regular season and occasional playoff soccer games involving the Tulsa Roughnecks. Notable Roughnecks telecasts that the station aired included the team's 1983 appearance in the Soccer Bowl, which saw the franchise win its first (and, as a result of the dissolution of the North American Soccer League following the 1984 season, only) national championship title.

During the 1986 and 1987 seasons, channel 41 (as KGCT) held the local syndication rights to broadcast Major League Baseball (MLB) games involving the St. Louis Cardinals (which were distributed by Anheuser-Busch's sports syndication subsidiary, Bud Sports); Cardinals telecasts returned to KOKI (which had aired the team's broadcasts from 1980 until 1985) for the 1988 season after a two-year absence. In addition, KGCT carried Kansas City Royals game telecasts – then produced by the team's flagship broadcaster at the time, Kansas City NBC affiliate WDAF-TV (now a Fox affiliate) – during the 1988 season, acquiring the rights from then-rival KOKI-TV (which had aired the team's broadcasts from 1980 until 1987), as well as those involving the Texas Rangers from 1985 until 1988. Also from 1985 to 1988, KGCT held the local rights to NFL preseason games involving the Dallas Cowboys, carrying three to four prime time game telecasts annually.

Following the two-year sabbatical spurred by Green Country Associates' attempts to sell the station, channel 41 restocked its programming inventory with sports event packages, including some (such as the Cowboys preseason package) that were acquired by KOKI-TV during that time. Texas Rangers baseball games returned to KTFO in 1991, concurring with its acquisition of NBA games involving the Dallas Mavericks. (Games from both teams were produced by then-independent KTVT [now a CBS owned-and-operated station] in Dallas–Fort Worth, from which the syndicated Rangers and Mavericks telecasts originated through the 1995 Rangers season, returning KTVT-televised sports to the Tulsa market since Tulsa Cable Television dropped the station in January 1990 due to United Video failing to ensure that its superstation feed was programmed in compliance with syndication exclusivity rules then being re-implemented by the FCC.) These packages were joined in 1993 by the return of the Royals and Cardinals packages. KTFO relinquished rights to all of the baseball packages prior to the 1995 Major League Baseball season; however, it regained broadcasts of Rangers games (produced by both KTVT and partner outlet KXTX-TV) in 1996.

In 1992, channel 41 assumed the local rights to the Southeastern Conference (SEC) syndication package by Jefferson-Pilot Communications and Raycom Sports, carrying regular season college football and basketball games as well as the SEC men's basketball tournament. (After Raycom lost the SEC television rights to ESPN in 2009, all SEC game telecasts syndicated through ESPN Plus-oriented SEC TV were carried on GEB America outlet KGEB [channel 53] from 2009 until 2014, when the conference made most of its sports events cable-exclusive to the SEC Network venture between the SEC and ESPN.) The station also carried select college basketball games involving the Oklahoma State Cowboys beginning with the 1992–93 academic season. From 1998 to 2014, channel 41 carried regular season and postseason college basketball games involving teams from the Big 12 Conference (distributed by ESPN Plus), which gave the station rights to select regular season games featuring the Cowboys and the Oklahoma Sooners, as well as any of their playoff appearances during the Big 12 men's basketball tournament. Most college basketball telecasts on aired on the station on Saturday afternoons, although it also occasionally carried prime time games on weeknights, specifically during the Big 12 men's tournament.

Newscasts
Channel 41 (as KGCT) offered local programming at its sign-on in March 1981, in the form of a daytime news and talk block under the 41 Live! banner. Original general manager Ray Beindorf intended to model the daytime lineup in the vein of the all-local news programming format employed by fellow independent KAUT-TV downstate in Oklahoma City upon that station's October 1980 sign-on. (Incidentally, one of KAUT's original news employees, former KTUL reporter and eventual KJRH anchor Karen Keith, was a member of KGCT's original reporting staff.)

Difficulties accruing the necessary financial capital to pull off such an ambitious format led Beindorf to scale back these plans; instead, the station's news programming encompassed only a three-hour rolling late-afternoon block that ran from 4:00 to 7:00 p.m. weekdays. Anchored by Beth Rengel (who would eventually become an anchor/reporter at KJRH and later at KOTV) and John Hudson, it featured a mix of local news as well as national and international news content sourced from CNN. The station also produced a two-hour midday talk program, Erling on the Mall, hosted by KRMG reporter John Erling (which aired live at 12:00 p.m., with a rebroadcast at 2:00). The news format was ultimately unprofitable and the news department was shuttered by the station in June 1981; thereafter, the station's news programming was reduced mainly to updates shown during commercial breaks within regular programming until the station went dark in February 1989.

After KOKI launched its own news department in February 2002, channel 41 (as KTFO) began carrying that station's prime time newscast during instances in which a Fox Sports telecasts (mainly for MLB playoff games), or rarely, a special movie presentation scheduled by Fox run past the 9:00 p.m. timeslot. (The deferral of the 9:00 broadcast did not expand to include situations involving overruns caused by prime time college football telecasts, when Fox began carrying regular season games on Saturday nights in September 2011; however, it did expand to include deferrals of the weekend editions of KOKI's 5:00 p.m. newscasts after they were launched in January 2016.) Plans also initially called for KOKI to begin producing an early evening newscast for channel 41, similar to the production that Jacksonville sister station WAWS produced for then-LMA partner WTEV from 1999 until 2001, months before the latter took over as the CBS affiliate for that market. On September 16, 2013, the station began simulcasting the full 5:00 to 9:00 a.m. block of KOKI's weekday morning newscast; the simulcast later expanded to encompass the 4:30 half-hour added on October 6, 2014. The station stopped airing the simulcast in December 2017.

Technical information

Subchannels
The station's digital signal is multiplexed:

Analog-to-digital conversion
KMYT-TV (as KTFO) launched a digital signal on UHF channel 42 in June 2005. The station planned to launch its digital signal by the May 1, 2002, deadline for full-power television stations to sign on a digital feed; however, Clear Channel was granted an extension request by the FCC to allow its digital signal to become operational by June 15. Complicating matters, UHF 42 had also been assigned to fellow UPN affiliate KAUT-TV (now an independent station) in Oklahoma City, which led KAUT's then-owner, Viacom Television Stations Group, to apply to relocate its digital channel assignment to UHF 40 in order to prevent co-channel interference with the KTFO digital feed.

KMYT shut down its analog signal – over UHF channel 41 – on February 17, 2009, the original target date for full-power television stations in the United States to transition from analog to digital broadcasts under federal mandate (which Congress had moved the previous month to June 12 to allow additional time for consumers unprepared for the changeover to make necessary precautions to continue receiving broadcast stations). The station's digital signal remained on its pre-transition UHF channel 42. Through the use of PSIP, digital television receivers display the station's virtual channel as its former UHF analog channel 41. Newport Television and KOKI-KMYT management elected to turn off the KMYT analog signal on the original February 17 transition date, but delayed sister station KOKI's switch to digital-only transmissions by five months, in order to enable viewers who were not prepared for the transition to continue receiving news and emergency weather information through the spring 2009 severe weather season.

References

External links
www.fox23.com/s/station/my41tulsa – KMYT-TV official website
www.fox23.com – KOKI-TV official website

MYT-TV
MyNetworkTV affiliates
This TV affiliates
Cozi TV affiliates
Heroes & Icons affiliates
Start TV affiliates
Television channels and stations established in 1981
1981 establishments in Oklahoma
Imagicomm Communications